Davit Harutyunyan (also transliterated as David) (born March 5, 1963, in Yerevan) is an Armenian politician who served as the deputy Minister of Justice from 1997 to 1998, and as Minister of Justice from 1998 to 2007. He was first elected to the Armenian parliament in 1995.

In 2006, Forbes magazine listed him as the 10th-richest person in Armenia.

References

Living people
1963 births
Politicians from Yerevan
Government ministers of Armenia
Armenian Ministers of Justice